The Japanese destroyer {{nihongo|Okikaze|沖風|Offshore Wind}} was one of 15 s built for the Imperial Japanese Navy during the late 1910s. The ship served as a plane guard and played a minor role in the First Shanghai incident during the 1930s. She spent most of the Pacific War on escort duties in Japanese waters until she was sunk by an American submarine in early 1943.

Design and description
The Minekaze class was designed with higher speed and better seakeeping than the preceding s. They were powered by two Parsons geared steam turbines, each driving one propeller shaft, using steam provided by four Kampon water-tube boilers. Their crew consisted of 148 officers and crewmen.

The main armament of the Minekaze-class ships consisted of four  Type 3 guns in single mounts; one gun forward of the superstructure, one between the two funnels, one aft of the rear funnel, and the last gun atop the aft superstructure. The guns were numbered '1' to '4' from front to rear. The ships carried three above-water twin sets of  torpedo tubes; one mount was in the well deck between the forward superstructure and the forward gun and the other two were between the aft funnel and aft superstructure. They could also carry 20 mines as well as minesweeping gear.

Early in the war, Nos. 2 and 3 guns and both sets of aft torpedo tubes were removed in exchange for four depth charge throwers, 36 depth charges, and 10 license-built  Type 96 light AA guns.

Construction and career
Okikaze, built at the Maizuru Naval Arsenal, was laid down on 22 February 1919, launched on 3 October 1919 and completed on 17 August 1920.

From 1930 to 1932, Destroyer Division 2 was assigned to the IJN 1st Air Fleet as part of the escort of the aircraft carrier , to assist in search and rescue operations for downed aircraft. At the time of the First Shanghai incident of 1932, Okikaze was engaged in river patrol duties along the Yangzi River in China.

Pacific War

At the time of the attack on Pearl Harbor on 7 December 1941, Okikaze was based at the Ōminato Guard District in northern Japan, and was assigned to patrols of the Tsugaru Strait and the coastline of southern Hokkaidō. In April 1942, Okikaze was recalled to the Yokosuka Naval District, where it was assigned anti-submarine patrols of the entrance of Tokyo Bay for the duration of the war, making only an occasional convoy escort run along the coast of Japan to Kushimoto, Wakayama or patrols of the coast of northern Honshū through the end of 1942.

One torpedo hit under the well deck and folded the destroyer's forecastle up at a 45° angle, and another hit Okikazes stern. The ship sank with the loss of most crewmen, including the captain. However, Okikaze was not officially removed from the Navy List until 1 March 1944.

Notes

References

External links
Minekaze-class destroyers on Materials of the Imperial Japanese Navy

Minekaze-class destroyers
Ships built by Maizuru Naval Arsenal
1919 ships
World War II destroyers of Japan
Ships sunk by American submarines
World War II shipwrecks in the Pacific Ocean
Maritime incidents in January 1943